In chemistry, catenation is the bonding of atoms of the same element into a series, called a chain. A chain or a ring shape may be open if its ends are not bonded to each other (an open-chain compound), or closed if they are bonded in a ring (a cyclic compound). The words to catenate and catenation reflect the Latin root catena, "chain".

Carbon
Catenation occurs most readily with carbon, which forms covalent bonds with other carbon atoms to form longer chains and structures. This is the reason for the presence of the vast number of organic compounds in nature. Carbon is most well known for its properties of catenation, with organic chemistry essentially being the study of catenated carbon structures (and known as catenae). Carbon chains in biochemistry combine any of various other elements, such as hydrogen, oxygen, and biometals, onto the backbone of carbon.

However, carbon is by no means the only element capable of forming such catenae, and several other main-group elements are capable of forming an expansive range of catenae, including hydrogen, boron, silicon, phosphorus,  sulfur and halogens.

The ability of an element to catenate is primarily based on the bond energy of the element to itself, which decreases with more diffuse orbitals (those with higher azimuthal quantum number) overlapping to form the bond.  Hence, carbon, with the least diffuse valence shell p orbital is capable of forming longer p-p sigma bonded chains of atoms than heavier elements which bond via higher valence shell orbitals. Catenation ability is also influenced by a range of steric and electronic factors, including the electronegativity of the element in question, the molecular orbital n and the ability to form different kinds of covalent bonds. For carbon, the sigma overlap between adjacent atoms is sufficiently strong that perfectly stable chains can be formed. With other elements this was once thought to be extremely difficult in spite of plenty of evidence to the contrary.

Hydrogen
Theories of the structure of water involve three-dimensional networks of tetrahedra and chains and rings, linked via hydrogen bonding.

A polycatenated network, with rings formed from metal-templated hemispheres linked by hydrogen bonds, was reported in 2008.

In organic chemistry, hydrogen bonding is known to facilitate the formation of chain structures. 4-tricyclanol C10H16O, for example, shows catenated hydrogen bonding between the hydroxyl groups, leading to the formation of helical chains; crystalline isophthalic acid C8H6O4 is built up from molecules connected by hydrogen bonds, forming infinite chains.

In unusual conditions, a 1-dimensional series of hydrogen molecules confined within a single wall carbon nanotube is expected to become metallic at a relatively low pressure of 163.5 GPa. This is about 40% of the ~400 GPa thought to be required to metallize ordinary hydrogen, a pressure which is difficult to access experimentally.

Silicon
Silicon can form sigma bonds to other silicon atoms (and disilane is the parent of this class of compounds). However, it is difficult to prepare and isolate SinH2n+2 (analogous to the saturated alkane hydrocarbons) with n greater than about 8, as their thermal stability decreases with increases in the number of silicon atoms.  Silanes higher in molecular weight than disilane decompose to polymeric polysilicon hydride and hydrogen.  But with a suitable pair of organic substituents in place of hydrogen on each silicon it is possible to prepare polysilanes (sometimes, erroneously called polysilenes) that are analogues of alkanes. These long chain compounds have surprising electronic properties - high electrical conductivity, for example - arising from sigma delocalization of the electrons in the chain.

Even silicon–silicon pi bonds are possible. However, these bonds are less stable than the carbon analogues. Disilane is quite reactive compared to ethane. Disilene and disilynes are quite rare, unlike alkenes and alkynes. Examples of disilynes, long thought to be too unstable to be isolated were reported in 2004.

Boron 
In dodecaborate(12) anion, twelve boron atoms covalently link to each other to form an icosahedral structure. Various other similar motifs are also well studied, such as boranes, carboranes and metal dicarbollides.

Nitrogen 
Nitrogen, unlike its neighbor carbon, is much less likely to form chains that are stable at room temperature. Some examples of which are solid nitrogen, triazane, azide anion and triazoles. Even longer series with eight nitrogen atoms or more, such as 1,1'-Azobis-1,2,3-triazole, have been synthesized. These compounds have potentially use as a convenient way to store large amount of energy.

Phosphorus
Phosphorus chains (with organic substituents) have been prepared, although these tend to be quite fragile. Small rings or clusters are more common.

Sulfur
The versatile chemistry of elemental sulfur is largely due to catenation. In the native state, sulfur exists as S8 molecules. On heating these rings open and link together giving rise to increasingly long chains, as evidenced by the progressive increase in viscosity as the chains lengthen. Also, sulfur polycations, sulfur polyanions (polysulfides) and lower sulfur oxides are all known. Furthermore, selenium and tellurium show variants of these structural motifs.

Semimetallic elements
In recent years a variety of double and triple bonds between the semi-metallic elements have been reported, including silicon, germanium, arsenic, bismuth and so on. The ability of certain main group elements to catenate is currently the subject of research into inorganic polymers.

Halogen elements 
Except for fluorine that can only form unstable polyfluorides at low temperature, all other stable halogens (Cl, Br, I) can form several isopolyhalogen anions that are stable at room temperature, of which the most prominent example being triiodide. In all these anions, the halogen atoms of the same element bond to each other.

See also
Backbone chain
Chain-growth polymerization
Macromolecule
Aromaticity
Polyhalogen ions
Polysulfides
Superatom
Inorganic polymer
Self-assembly

References

Bibliography

Organic chemistry
Inorganic chemistry